Alain Sylvain Amougou (Ukrainian: Ален Сільвен Амугу born 6 September 1973 in Yaounde, Cameroon) is a Cameroonian retired professional footballer.

Career

South Africa

Recruited by Mamelodi Sundowns of the South African Premier Division for 1999/00, Amougou racked 15 goals that season, showing the ability of his left foot but his next two years at Chloorkop were plagued by injuries and other problems.

Speculation about him being arrested abated when he was called to front the Sundowns' attack in the first round of the 2000 CAF Champions League.

Ukraine

Reinforcing Metalist Kharkiv of the Ukrainian Premier League in 2002, the first African to be in the club, the Cameroonian racked 4 league and 1 cup outing there, debuting on the 27th of July in a 1–1 tie with Obolon before being released by the end 2002. Two reasons for his release are that he did not lineup to expectations and that he did not like the Ukrainian environment.

Sweden

Set to complete a move to IFK Norrköping of the Swedish Allsvenskan in 2002, Peking rejected the forward, causing him to return home.

References

External links
 Ukrainian Wikipedia Page 
 Allayers.in.ua Profile

1973 births
Footballers from Yaoundé
Association football forwards
Expatriate soccer players in South Africa
Expatriate footballers in Réunion
Cameroonian footballers
Living people
Cameroonian expatriate footballers
Expatriate footballers in Ukraine
Mamelodi Sundowns F.C. players
FC Metalist Kharkiv players
SS Saint-Louisienne players
Ukrainian Premier League players
Cameroonian expatriate sportspeople in Ukraine